The Rey del Ring (2014) show (Spanish for "King of the Ring") was an annual professional wrestling major event produced by Mexican professional wrestling promotion International Wrestling Revolution Group (IWRG), and took place on May 4, 2014 in Arena Naucalpan, Naucalpan, State of Mexico, Mexico. The main event was the Eponymous IWRG Rey del Ring tournament, the twelfth annual version of the tournament, which is IWRG's version of WWE's Royal Rumble event.

Production

Background
The Mexican professional wrestling company International Wrestling Revolution Group (IWRG; at times referred to as Grupo Internacional Revolución in Mexico) started their annual Rey del Ring ("King of the Ring") event in 2002, creating an annual event around the eponymous Rey del Ring match, a 30-man elimination match similar in concept to the WWE's Royal Rumble match. From 2002 until the 2011 event the "prize" for winning the match itself was simply the prestige of outlasting 29 other competitors, but at the 2011 Rey del Ring IWRG introduced the IWR Rey del Ring Championship complete with a belt to symbolize the championship that would be awarded to the winner each year. At that point in time the Rey del Ring title became a championship that could be defended and lost or won in matches in between the annual tournaments. For the tournament the champion would vacate the Rey del Ring Championship prior to the actual Rey del Ring match itself. All Rey del Ring shows, as well as the majority of the IWRG shows in general are held in "Arena Naucalpan", owned by the promoters of IWRG and their main arena. The 2014 Rey del Ring was the twelfth over all Rey del Ring tournament held by IWRG.

Storylines
The event featured three professional wrestling matches with different wrestlers involved in pre-existing scripted feuds, plots and storylines. Wrestlers were portrayed as either heels (referred to as rudos in Mexico, those that portray the "bad guys") or faces (técnicos in Mexico, the "good guy" characters) as they followed a series of tension-building events, which culminated in a wrestling match or series of matches.

Results

References

External links 
IWRG official website

2014 in professional wrestling
2014 in Mexico
IWRG Rey del Ring
May 2014 events in Mexico